The second season of the reality competition series Mongolia's Got Talent premiered in the summer of 2016 and was broadcast on September 5, 2016. The judges were Tserendorj Chuluunbat (bass guitarist from Haranga rock band), Sarantsetseg Chimgee (news commentator from Mongol TV), Chimeglkham Delgertsetseg (professional violist) and Rokit Bay (Mongolian rapper).

Golden Buzzer
The Golden Buzzer was added in the series. If the act gets buzzed, they automatically advance to the Choice Round. Five performances got it.

Preliminary auditions
Auditions in front of the judges began in summer 2016 and aired on September 5, 2016. The Golden Buzzer will be buzzed by the judges if they want.

Judge Cuts
Judges picked 32 from winners of the Preliminary auditions to enter the semi-finals without performing.

Semi-finals

The 32 contestants that qualified from Round 2 will face each other in groups. The semi-final contains four groups and each group contains eight contestants. The contestants with the most votes automatically advance to the final round, and the 2nd and 3rd most voted contestants will picked by the Judges. The winner of the Judges Choice will qualify for the final round. If the judges choice ties the most voted one will be qualified.

Group 1

Guest(s): Uka

Group 2

Guest(s): TBD

Finale
The 8 winners of the semi-finals (2 each group) will compete and the people will decide the winner.

Final Group

Mongolia's Got Talent